The 2017 season was Viking's 29th consecutive year in Eliteserien, and their 68th season in the top flight of Norwegian football.

Season events
Ian Burchnall replaced Kjell Jonevret as manager on 24 November 2016.

Almost a year later, on 9 November 2017, Burchnall was fired from the job following the club's relegation to OBOS-ligaen.

Squad

Out on loan

Transfers

Winter

In:

Out:

Summer

In:

Out:

Competitions

Eliteserien

League table

Results summary

Results by round

Matches

Norwegian Cup

Squad statistics

Appearances and goals

|-
! colspan=14 style=background:#dcdcdc; text-align:center| Goalkeepers

|-
! colspan=14 style=background:#dcdcdc; text-align:center| Defenders

|-
! colspan=14 style=background:#dcdcdc; text-align:center| Midfielders

|-
! colspan=14 style=background:#dcdcdc; text-align:center| Forwards

|-
! colspan=14 style=background:#dcdcdc; text-align:center| Players out on loan

|-
! colspan=14 style=background:#dcdcdc; text-align:center| Players who have made an appearance or had a squad number this season but have left the club

|}

Goal scorers

Disciplinary record

References

Viking FK seasons
Viking